Bari Marconi is a railway station in the Italian city of Bari, in the Province of Bari, Apulia. It opened on 31 May 1992 and lies on the Adriatic Railway (Ancona–Lecce). The train services are operated by Trenitalia.

Train services
The station is served by the following services(s):

Regional services (Treno regionale) Foggia-Barletta-Trani-Molfetta-Bari - Monopoli - Fasano - Brindisi - Lecce *Regional services (Treno regionale) Bari-Monopoli-Fasano-Brindisi-Lecce

See also
Railway stations in Italy
List of railway stations in Apulia
Rail transport in Italy
History of rail transport in Italy

External links

This article is based upon a translation of the Italian language version as at May 2014.

Railway stations in Apulia
Railway stations opened in 1992
Buildings and structures in the Province of Bari
1992 establishments in Italy
Railway stations in Italy opened in the 20th century